Natur is an Israeli settlement in the southern Golan Heights. The settlement was established as a kibbutz after Israel occupied the area in the Six Day War in 1967. In , it had a population of  settlers.

The international community considers Israeli settlements in the Golan Heights illegal under international law, but the Israeli government disputes this.

History
Natur was established in 1980 by high school graduates from kibbutzim affiliated with the Hashomer Hatzair movement. In 2007 it converted from a kibbutz to a moshav. Membership at that time was nearly 200 people. Natur is a mixed religious-secular community.

Archaeology
In 1984, several dolmens were excavated in Natur near the kibbutz chicken coops. Numerous stone heaps were documented in the area, along with terraces, walls and circular animal pens, some of which may date from ancient times.

See also
Israeli-occupied territories

References

Israeli settlements in the Golan Heights
Kibbutzim
Populated places established in 1980
Golan Regional Council
1980 establishments in the Israeli Military Governorate